John Samuel Miller (26 February 1779 – 24 May 1830) was an English naturalist.

Miller, who was born Johann Müller, lived in Bristol. He was a Member of the Linnean Society.
He wrote "Natural History of the Crinoides" (1821) online here and a "Memoir on the Belemnites" (Transactions of the Geological Society for 1832) and in 1822 "A list of the freshwater and landshells occurring in the environment of Bristol, with observations''.

References

1779 births
1830 deaths
English naturalists
English malacologists
English palaeontologists